Nowtarki-ye Mokhtari (also Romanized as Nowtarkī-ye Mokhtārī; also known as Nartarkī-ye Mokhtārī and Nowtargī-ye Mokhtārī) is a village in Howmeh-ye Gharbi Rural District, in the Central District of Izeh County, Khuzestan Province, Iran. At the 2006 census, its population was 359, in 72 families.

References 

Populated places in Izeh County